Camellia tunghinensis is a species of plant in the family Theaceae. It is endemic to China.  It is threatened by habitat loss.

References

tunghinensis
Endemic flora of China
Vulnerable plants
Taxonomy articles created by Polbot
Taxobox binomials not recognized by IUCN